Patricia Skinner may refer to:
 Patricia Skinner (fencer)
 Patricia Skinner (historian)